John D. Alexander may refer to:

John D. Alexander (politician) (1903–?), Canadian politician
John D. Alexander (admiral) (born 1959), U.S. Navy admiral

See also
John Alexander (disambiguation)